Raymond Stewart (born 9 January 1976) is a Jamaican cricketer. He played in one List A match for the Jamaican cricket team in 1999/00.

See also
 List of Jamaican representative cricketers

References

External links
 

1976 births
Living people
Jamaican cricketers
Jamaica cricketers
Cricketers from Kingston, Jamaica